Sphaerium corneum, also known as the European fingernailclam, is a very small freshwater clam, an aquatic bivalve mollusk in the family Sphaeriidae, the fingernail clams.

Description
The shell is fairly globular and can grow up to 9–13.5 mm in size. The color of the shell is usually a brown to gray  with the juveniles being a yellow color. Their shells exhibit striae, thin parallel rows of elevated lines.

Ecology

These small clams are found in shallow, freshwater habitats with slow moving waters, including freshwater lakes, rivers and creeks. As with most bivalves, Sphaerium corneum is mainly a filter feeder and thus prefers more eutrophic waters that provide a greater food source. These clams have exhibited a unique ability to climb up plants and structures around their habitat to find more optimal locations for feeding. They also are known to deposit feed in times of low current or food availability. This species has shown a preference however for slow currents in their habitats (Lotic ecosystem), which will provide a constant supply of food. Their primary food sources are diatoms and other phytoplankton.

S. corneum are sensitive to high pollution levels, particularly organic pollutants which foul the water, preventing the clams from effective feeding. As such, they are a bioindicator species whose presence may demonstrate that the water is relatively unpolluted. This allows them to burrow down into sand, mud, gravel and other inorganic substrates where oxygen levels are low to avoid predation and to explore other food sources. Their anoxic tolerance also allows them to survive at times where low water levels lead to a quick depletion of oxygen, but as they are sensitive to desiccation, or drying out, they cannot survive for extended periods without water.

These clams can live up to three years, although geographic location greatly influences their survival rates. In their native habitats, they may reach their full lifespan, although in the United States and other non-native areas the clams average only 1 to 1 1/2 years. They are considered mature once they reach 4 mm. This can be as early as three months in their native habitat.

Distribution
The native distribution of this species is Palearctic.

 Czech Republic – in Bohemia, in Moravia, least concern (LC)
 Finland – throughout the country
 Germany – a common species in most of Germany, but it is in listed as endangered (gefährdet) in Thuringia
 Netherlands
 Norway – lowland areas
 Sweden – throughout the country
 United States – nonindigenous
 and many other countries

According to Kuiper et al., the species does not occur in the Faroes nor in Iceland.

In freshwater: standing water and slow-running rivers.

References

External links
 https://www.biolib.cz/en/taxon/id3012

corneum
Palearctic molluscs
Molluscs described in 1758
Taxa named by Carl Linnaeus